Utricularia lloydii is a small or very small annual carnivorous plant that belongs to the genus Utricularia. It is endemic to Central and South America and is widespread but known from few collections in Bolivia, Brazil, Panama, Suriname, Venezuela. It was originally named by E. M. Merl and formally described and published by Francis Ernest Lloyd in 1932. Merl named it in honor of Lloyd.

See also 
 List of Utricularia species

References 

Carnivorous plants of Central America
Carnivorous plants of South America
Flora of Bolivia
Flora of Brazil
Flora of Panama
Flora of Suriname
Flora of Venezuela
lloydii